Bras Basah is a district located in the Museum Planning Area of the Central Area of Singapore. Bras Basah (Modern Spelling: Beras Basah) means "wet rice" in Malay – beras means harvested rice with husk removed, and basah means wet. The precinct houses several landmarks including Fairmont Singapore, Raffles Hotel, the Singapore Art Museum, the Cathedral of the Good Shepherd and the Singapore Management University. A Mass Rapid Transit (MRT) station, Bras Basah MRT station, is on the Circle line.

References

Places in Singapore